Troilo Agnesi was a Roman Catholic prelate who served as Bishop of Guardialfiera (1498–?), 
Bishop of Lavello (1487–1498),
Bishop of Telese o Cerreto Sannita (1483–1487), 
and Bishop of Penne e Atri (1482–1483).

Biography
On 30 October 1482, Troilo Agnesi was appointed Bishop of Penne e Atri by Pope Sixtus IV.
On 17 December 1483, he was appointed by Pope Sixtus IV as Bishop of Telese o Cerreto Sannita.
On 12 February 1487, he was appointed by Pope Innocent VIII as Bishop of Lavello.
On 4 July 1498, he was appointed by Pope Alexander VI as Bishop of Guardialfiera.

It is uncertain how long he served as Bishop of Guardialfiera; the next record of a bishop is Marco Antonio Vascheri, who was appointed in 1510.

See also
Catholic Church in Italy

References

External links and additional sources
 (for Chronology of Bishops) 
 (for Chronology of Bishops) 
 (Chronology of Bishops) 
 (Chronology of Bishops) 
 (Chronology of Bishops) 
 (Chronology of Bishops) 
 (for Chronology of Bishops) 
 (for Chronology of Bishops) 

15th-century Italian Roman Catholic bishops
Bishops appointed by Pope Sixtus IV
Bishops appointed by Pope Innocent VIII
Bishops appointed by Pope Alexander VI